Richter is an unincorporated community in Franklin County, Kansas, United States.

History    
A post office was opened in Richter in 1890, and remained in operation until it was discontinued in 1907.

References

Further reading

External links
 Franklin County maps: Current, Historic, KDOT

Unincorporated communities in Kansas
Unincorporated communities in Franklin County, Kansas